The semi-contrabassoon (also called quint bassoon, semi-contra or half-contra) is a double reed woodwind instrument pitched between the bassoon and the contrabassoon.  It is pitched in either F (quint bass) or G (quart bass) a fifth or fourth, respectively, below the bassoon.

These instruments were used mostly in the 18th century and are remnants of the old quart bass dulcians. They were considered easier to make than the larger contrabassoon. Little literature exists that indicate that these instruments were used, although it is possible that they may have been used to some extent in military bands. No commercially available version of this instrument has yet been made. The great organist Charles Marie Widor in his book on orchestration expected that the semi-contra would be added to the orchestra's roster.

No instruments were ever constructed on his instigation.  Widor's remarks come in light of the dismal state of the French contrabassoon in the late 19th century, which was generally replaced with a contrabass sarrusophone.  Famous operetta composer Arthur Sullivan is said to have owned a semi-contra in F and included parts for it in some of his operettas.  Aside from the Great (quart) bass dulcians, the only modern reproductions of historical semi-contras are being made by Guntram Wolf of Germany.

References

Bassoons